Waconda USD 272 is a public unified school district headquartered in Cawker City, Kansas, United States.  The district includes the communities of Cawker City, Downs, Glen Elder, Tipton, and nearby rural areas.

Schools
The school district operates the following schools:
 Lakeside Junior-Senior High School in Downs.
 Lakeside Elementary School in Cawker City.

Lakeside Elementary was formerly known as Cawker City Elementary School, and it received its current name in 2015.

Former
Schools previously in operation:
 High schools:
 Downs High School (Downs)
 Waconda East High School (Cawker City)
 Junior high schools:
 Downs Junior High School (Downs)
 Glen Elder Junior High School (Glen Elder)
 Tipton Junior High School (Tipton)
 Primary schools:
 Downs Elementary School
 Glen Elder Elementary School
 Tipton Elementary School

See also
 Kansas State Department of Education
 Kansas State High School Activities Association
 List of high schools in Kansas
 List of unified school districts in Kansas

References

External links
 

School districts in Kansas
Education in Mitchell County, Kansas
Osborne County, Kansas